Bingo's Run is a 2014 novel by James A. Levine. The story follows Bingo, a street child from the Kibera slum in Nairobi, Kenya, who is a 15-year-old drug runner and "growth retard". Levine is a professor of medicine at the Mayo Clinic.

References

2014 American novels
Novels set in Kenya
Spiegel & Grau books